The Inauguration of the President of Ukraine is a ceremony that takes place to mark the start of a new term for a newly elected president.

Description

The presidential inauguration traditionally starts at the building of the Verkhovna Rada building in the center of the Pecherskyi District in Kyiv. Prior to the arrival of the president-elect, the chairman of the Verkhovna Rada introduces distinguished dignitaries including foreign guests and former presidents. Upon arrival, the president goes into the main chamber to the tune of the presidential fanfare, before beginning the ceremonies with a rendition of Shche ne vmerla Ukraina by a choir and band. Once this is done, the president-elect will put their hand on the Constitution of Ukraine and the Peresopnytsia Gospels simultaneously while reciting the oath of office administered by the chairman of the Constitutional Court of Ukraine:

According to article 104 of the constitution, the Ukrainian text for the oath is as follows:

Official English translation:

The new president then signs the text transfers it over to the chairman of the Constitutional Court after conducting the oath. The performance of the Molytva za Ukrainu (Prayer for Ukraine) will then follow. The president will then receive state symbols and heraldry, including the seal, the collar and bulava of the President of Ukraine. Once this is done, the president will deliver a speech that will be given in the Ukrainian language, although on some occasions Russian has been used throughout the speech. After the speech, the swearing-in-ceremony is declared closed and the president walks to the nearby Mariinskyi Palace to take the salute as supreme commander-in-chief of the Armed Forces of Ukraine. This formal military ceremony has also been known to take place at the Office of the President on Bankova and in 2014, on Sofia Square. During the ceremony the president receives the salute of the commander, Kyiv Presidential Honor Guard Battalion who reports the following:

Mr/Mrs President of Ukraine, Supreme Commander-in-chief of the Armed Forces of Ukraine, the Guard of Honour is formed up in your honor, Commander of the Guard of Honour, (states rank and name).

The president then inspects the guard before greeting them:

President: Glory to Ukraine!Parade formation: Glory to the Heroes!

The president then goes on to receive the report from the chiefs of the senior administrative institutions and the uniformed services of the military, including the minister of defence and the head of the security service, as of the most recent inauguration in 2019, the commanders state their name and rank (only if in uniform) and declares their institution's readiness to carry out their task. After this the battalion performs a marchpast to the tune of a march by its attached military band before heading inside.

The entire ceremony is covered on Ukrainian TV channels such as NTN, 5 Kanal, 1+1 and ICTV.

List of inaugural ceremonies

List of historical inaugurations

Hetman of Ukraine

Notes

 "at a ceremonial meeting of the Supreme Council of Ukraine" (Article 104, Constitution of Ukraine)
 the Chairperson of the Constitutional Court of Ukraine (Article 104, Constitution of Ukraine)
 marked as Constitution of Ukraine

References

External links

 Mykosyanchyk, O. How swore to people presidents of Ukraine. Vid i Do. 7 June 2014
 Videos of Inaugurations. Gazeta in Ukrainian. 7 June 2014
 Removska, O. Traditions of inauguration of presidents of Ukraine. Radio Liberty. 25 February 2014
 Nahorna, N. Inauguration of presidents. Television Service of News (TSN). 7 June 2014
 Pashchenko, V. Inauguration of Poroshenko: which will it be? Ukrinform. 5 June 2014
 Shafran, T. Pavlo Skoropadsky: the last hetman of Ukraine. Ukrainian Greek Catholic Church website. May 2013

 
Ukrainian presidential succession
Presidency of Ukraine
Ceremonies in Ukraine